Hyacinthaceae is a family of bulbous monocotyledenous flowering plants (anthophytes) in the order Asparagales. Named after the genus Hyacinthus, Hyacinthaceae include many  garden plants and are distributed mostly in Mediterranean climates, including South Africa, Central Asia and South America. Their flowers have six tepals and six stamens with a superior ovary, which previously placed them within the lily family (Liliaceae), and their leaves are fleshy, mucilaginous, and arranged in a basal rosette.

23,420 species of vascular plant have been recorded in South Africa, making it the sixth most species-rich country in the world and the most species-rich country on the African continent. Of these, 153 species are considered to be threatened. Nine biomes have been described in South Africa: Fynbos, Succulent Karoo, desert, Nama Karoo, grassland, savanna, Albany thickets, the Indian Ocean coastal belt, and forests.

The 2018 South African National Biodiversity Institute's National Biodiversity Assessment plant checklist lists 35,130 taxa in the phyla Anthocerotophyta (hornworts (6)), Anthophyta (flowering plants (33534)), Bryophyta (mosses (685)), Cycadophyta (cycads (42)), Lycopodiophyta (Lycophytes(45)), Marchantiophyta (liverworts (376)), Pinophyta (conifers (33)), and Pteridophyta (cryptogams (408)).

43 genera are represented in the literature. Listed taxa include species, subspecies, varieties, and forms as recorded, some of which have subsequently been allocated to other taxa as synonyms, in which cases the accepted taxon is appended to the listing. Multiple entries under alternative names reflect taxonomic revision over time.

Albuca 
Genus Albuca:
 Albuca abyssinica Jacq. indigenous
 Albuca acuminata Baker, indigenous
 Albuca affinis Baker, indigenous
 Albuca albucoides (Aiton) J.C.Manning & Goldblatt, endemic
 Albuca altissima Dryand. accepted as Albuca canadensis (L.) F.M.Leight.
 Albuca angolensis Welw. ex Baker, accepted as Ornithogalum abyssinicum (Jacq.) J.C.Manning & Goldblatt
 Albuca anisocrispa Mart.-Azorin & M.B.Crespo, endemic
 Albuca annulata Mart.-Azorin & M.B.Crespo, endemic
 Albuca arenosa J.C.Manning & Goldblatt, endemic
 Albuca aspera U.Mull.-Doblies, accepted as Albuca viscosa L.f.
 Albuca aurea Jacq. indigenous
 Albuca autumnula (U.Mull.-Doblies & D.Mull.-Doblies) J.C.Manning & Goldblatt, endemic
 Albuca bakeri Mart.-Azorin & M.B.Crespo, endemic
 Albuca barbata (Jacq.) J.C.Manning & Goldblatt, indigenous
 Albuca batteniana Hilliard & B.L.Burtt, indigenous
 Albuca baurii Baker, indigenous
 Albuca bifolia Baker, endemic
 Albuca bifoliata R.A.Dyer, indigenous
 Albuca bontebokensis U.Mull.-Doblies, accepted as Albuca viscosa L.f.
 Albuca boucheri U.Mull.-Doblies, endemic
 Albuca bracteata (Thunb.) J.C.Manning & Goldblatt, indigenous
 Albuca brevipes Baker, accepted as Albuca suaveolens (Jacq.) J.C.Manning & Goldblatt
 Albuca bruce-bayeri U.Mull.-Doblies, accepted as Albuca hallii U.Mull.-Doblies
 Albuca buffelspoortensis Van Jaarsv. endemic
 Albuca canadensis (L.) F.M.Leight. indigenous
 Albuca caudata Jacq., endemic
 Albuca chartacea (Mart.-Azorin, M.B.Crespo & A.P.Dold) J.C.Manning & Goldblatt, endemic
 Albuca ciliaris U.Mull.-Doblies indigenous
 Albuca circinata Baker, accepted as Albuca namaquensis Baker
 Albuca clanwilliamaegloria U.Mull.-Doblies, indigenous
 Albuca collina Baker indigenous
 Albuca concordiana Baker indigenous
 Albuca consanguinea (Kunth) J.C.Manning & Goldblatt, endemic
 Albuca cooperi Baker indigenous
 Albuca corymbosa Baker, indigenous
 Albuca craibii (Mart.-Azorin, M.B.Crespo & A.P.Dold) J.C.Manning & Goldblatt, endemic
 Albuca cremnophila Van Jaarsv. & A.E.van Wyk, endemic
 Albuca crinifolia Baker, indigenous
 Albuca crispa J.C.Manning & Goldblatt, endemic
 Albuca crudenii Archibald, endemic
 Albuca dalyae Baker, indigenous
 Albuca darlingana U.Mull.-Doblies, endemic
 Albuca deaconii Van Jaarsv. indigenous
 Albuca decipiens U.Mull.-Doblies, indigenous
 Albuca deserticola J.C.Manning & Goldblatt, indigenous
 Albuca deserticola J.C.Manning & Goldblatt subsp. deserticola, indigenous
 Albuca dilucula (Oberm.) J.C.Manning & Goldblatt, endemic
 Albuca dyeri (Poelln.) J.C.Manning & Goldblatt, indigenous
 Albuca echinosperma U.Mull.-Doblies, indigenous
 Albuca etesiogaripensis U.Mull.-Doblies, indigenous
 Albuca exigua (Mart.-Azorin, M.B.Crespo, A.P.Dold, M.Pinter & Wetschnig) J.C.Manning, endemic
 Albuca exuviata Baker, indigenous
 Albuca fastigiata Dryand. endemic
 Albuca fastigiata Dryand. var. fastigiata, indigenous
 Albuca flaccida Jacq. indigenous
 Albuca foetida U.Mull.-Doblies, indigenous
 Albuca fragrans Jacq. indigenous
 Albuca gariepensis J.C.Manning & Goldblatt, endemic
 Albuca gethylloides (U.Mull.-Doblies & D.Mull.-Doblies) J.C.Manning & Goldblatt, endemic
 Albuca gildenhuysii (Van Jaarsv.) Van Jaarsv. endemic
 Albuca glandulifera J.C.Manning & Goldblatt, indigenous
 Albuca glandulosa Baker, indigenous
 Albuca glauca Baker, indigenous
 Albuca glaucifolia (U.Mull.-Doblies & D.Mull.-Doblies) J.C.Manning & Goldblatt, endemic
 Albuca goswinii U.Mull.-Doblies, indigenous
 Albuca grandis J.C.Manning & Goldblatt, endemic
 Albuca granulata Baker, accepted as Albuca shawii Baker
 Albuca hallii U.Mull.-Doblies, indigenous
 Albuca hesquaspoortensis U.Mull.-Doblies, indigenous
 Albuca humilis Baker, indigenous
 Albuca imbricata F.M.Leight. accepted as Albuca juncifolia Baker
 Albuca jacquinii U.Mull.-Doblies, accepted as Albuca viscosa L.f.
 Albuca juncifolia Baker, indigenous
 Albuca juncifolia Baker subsp. xanthocodon (Hilliard & B.L.Burtt) U.Mull.-Doblies, accepted as Albuca xanthocodon Hilliard & B.L.Burtt, indigenous
 Albuca karachabpoortensis (U.Mull.-Doblies & D.Mull.-Doblies) J.C.Manning & Goldblatt, endemic
 Albuca karooica U.Mull.-Doblies, accepted as Albuca cooperi Baker
 Albuca kirstenii (J.C.Manning & Goldblatt) J.C.Manning & Goldblatt, endemic
 Albuca knersvlaktensis (U.Mull.-Doblies & D.Mull.-Doblies) J.C.Manning & Goldblatt, endemic
 Albuca leucantha U.Mull.-Doblies, indigenous
 Albuca littoralis (N.R.Crouch, D.Styles, A.J.Beaumont & Mart.-Azorin) J.C.Manning, endemic
 Albuca longifolia Baker, indigenous
 Albuca longipes Baker, indigenous
 Albuca macowanii Baker, indigenous
 Albuca massonii Baker, indigenous
 Albuca mater-familias U.Mull.-Doblies, accepted as Albuca flaccida Jacq.
 Albuca maxima Burm.f., accepted as Albuca canadensis (L.) F.M.Leight.
 Albuca melleri (Baker) Baker, accepted as Ornithogalum abyssinicum (Jacq.) J.C.Manning & Goldblatt
 Albuca monarchos (U.Mull.-Doblies & D.Mull.-Doblies) J.C.Manning & Goldblatt, endemic
 Albuca namaquensis Baker, indigenous
 Albuca nana Schonland, indigenous
 Albuca nathoana (U.Mull.-Doblies & D.Mull.-Doblies) J.C.Manning & Goldblatt, endemic
 Albuca navicula U.Mull.-Doblies, indigenous
 Albuca nelsonii N.E.Br. indigenous
 Albuca obtusa J.C.Manning & Goldblatt, indigenous
 Albuca osmynella (U.Mull.-Doblies & D.Mull.-Doblies) J.C.Manning & Goldblatt, endemic
 Albuca ovata (Thunb.) J.C.Manning & Goldblatt, indigenous
 Albuca papyracea J.C.Manning & Goldblatt, endemic
 Albuca paradoxa Dinter, indigenous
 Albuca patersoniae Schonland, indigenous
 Albuca paucifolia (U.Mull.-Doblies & D.Mull.-Doblies) J.C.Manning & Goldblatt, endemic
 Albuca paucifolia (U.Mull.-Doblies & D.Mull.-Doblies) J.C.Manning & Goldblatt subsp. karooparkensis, endemic
 Albuca paucifolia (U.Mull.-Doblies & D.Mull.-Doblies) J.C.Manning & Goldblatt subsp. paucifolia, endemic
 Albuca pearsonii (F.M.Leight.) J.C.Manning & Goldblatt, indigenous
 Albuca pentheri (Zahlbr.) J.C.Manning & Goldblatt, endemic
 Albuca polyphylla Baker, indigenous
 Albuca prasina (Ker Gawl.) J.C.Manning & Goldblatt, indigenous
 Albuca prolifera J.H.Wilson, indigenous
 Albuca psammophora (U.Mull.-Doblies & D.Mull.-Doblies) J.C.Manning & Goldblatt, endemic
 Albuca pseudobifolia Mart.-Azorin & M.B.Crespo, endemic
 Albuca riebeekkasteelberganula U.Mull.-Doblies, endemic
 Albuca robertsoniana U.Mull.-Doblies, indigenous
 Albuca rogersii Schonland, indigenous
 Albuca roodeae (E.Phillips) J.C.Manning & Goldblatt, indigenous
 Albuca rupestris Hilliard & B.L.Burtt, indigenous
 Albuca sabulosa (U.Mull.-Doblies & D.Mull.-Doblies) J.C.Manning & Goldblatt, endemic
 Albuca scabrocostata (U.Mull.-Doblies & D.Mull.-Doblies) J.C.Manning & Goldblatt, endemic
 Albuca schlechteri Baker, indigenous
 Albuca schoenlandii Baker, indigenous
 Albuca secunda (Jacq.) J.C.Manning & Goldblatt, endemic
 Albuca seineri (Engl. & K.Krause) J.C.Manning & Goldblatt, indigenous
 Albuca semipedalis Baker, endemic
 Albuca setosa Jacq. indigenous
 Albuca shawii Baker, indigenous
 Albuca spiralis L.f. indigenous
 Albuca stuetzeliana (U.Mull.-Doblies & D.Mull.-Doblies) J.C.Manning & Goldblatt, indigenous
 Albuca suaveolens (Jacq.) J.C.Manning & Goldblatt, indigenous
 Albuca subglandulosa (U.Mull.-Doblies & D.Mull.-Doblies) J.C.Manning & Goldblatt, endemic
 Albuca tenuifolia Baker, indigenous
 Albuca thermarum Van Jaarsv. endemic
 Albuca tortuosa Baker, indigenous
 Albuca toxicaria (C.Archer & R.H.Archer) J.C.Manning & Goldblatt, indigenous
 Albuca trachyphylla U.Mull.-Doblies, indigenous
 Albuca transvaalensis Mogg, indigenous
 Albuca unifolia (Retz.) J.C.Manning & Goldblatt, indigenous
 Albuca unifoliata G.D.Rowley, endemic
 Albuca villosa U.Mull.-Doblies, indigenous
 Albuca villosa U.Mull.-Doblies subsp. glabra U.Mull.-Doblies, endemic
 Albuca villosa U.Mull.-Doblies subsp. villosa, near endemic
 Albuca virens (Ker Gawl.) J.C.Manning & Goldblatt, indigenous
 Albuca virens (Ker Gawl.) J.C.Manning & Goldblatt subsp. arida (Oberm.) J.C.Manning & Goldblatt, indigenous
 Albuca virens (Ker Gawl.) J.C.Manning & Goldblatt subsp. virens, indigenous
 Albuca viscosa L.f. indigenous
 Albuca viscosella U.Mull.-Doblies, accepted asAlbuca viscosa L.f.
 Albuca vittata Ker Gawl. indigenous
 Albuca watermeyeri (L.Bolus) J.C.Manning & Goldblatt, endemic
 Albuca weberlingiorum U.Mull.-Doblies, indigenous
 Albuca xanthocodon Hilliard & B.L.Burtt, indigenous
 Albuca zebrina Baker, endemic

Amphisiphon 
Genus Amphisiphon:
 Amphisiphon stylosa W.F.Barker, accepted as Daubenya stylosa (W.F.Barker) A.M.van der Merwe & J.C.Manning
 Androsiphon capense Schltr. accepted as Daubenya capensis (Schltr.) A.M.van der Merwe & J.C.Manning

Baeoterpe 
Genus Baeoterpe:
 Baeoterpe corymbosa (L.) Salisb. accepted as Lachenalia corymbosa (L.) J.C.Manning & Goldblatt, indigenous

Boweia 
Genus Bowiea:
 Bowiea gariepensis Van Jaarsv. accepted as Bowiea volubilis Harv. ex Hook.f. subsp. gariepensis (Van Jaarsv.) Bruyns
 Bowiea volubilis Harv. ex Hook.f. indigenous
 Bowiea volubilis Harv. ex Hook.f. subsp. gariepensis (Van Jaarsv.) Bruyns, indigenous
 Bowiea volubilis Harv. ex Hook.f. subsp. volubilis, indigenous

Brachyscypha 
Genus Brachyscypha:
 Brachyscypha undulata (Thunb.) Baker, accepted as Lachenalia pusilla Jacq. indigenous

Coelanthus 
Genus Coelanthus:
 Coelanthus complicatus Willd. ex Roem. & Schult. accepted as Lachenalia reflexa Thunb. indigenous

Daubenya 
Genus Daubenya:
 Daubenya alba A.M.van der Merwe, endemic
 Daubenya angustifolia (L.f.) A.M.van der Merwe & J.C.Manning, accepted as Massonia angustifolia L.f. indigenous
 Daubenya aurea Lindl. endemic
 Daubenya capensis (Schltr.) A.M.van der Merwe & J.C.Manning, endemic
 Daubenya comata (Burch. ex Baker) J.C.Manning & A.M.van der Merwe, endemic
 Daubenya marginata (Willd. ex Kunth) J.C.Manning & A.M.van der Merwe, endemic
 Daubenya namaquensis (Schltr.) J.C.Manning & Goldblatt, endemic
 Daubenya stylosa (W.F.Barker) A.M.van der Merwe & J.C.Manning, endemic
 Daubenya zeyheri (Kunth) J.C.Manning & A.M.van der Merwe, endemic

Desertia 
Genus Desertia:
 Desertia luteovirens Mart.-Azorin, M.Pinter & Wetschnig, accepted as Massonia luteovirens (Mart.-Azorin, M.Pinter & Wetschnig) J.C.Manning, indigenous

Dipcadi 
Genus Dipcadi:
 Dipcadi bakerianum Bolus, indigenous
 Dipcadi brevifolium (Thunb.) Fourc. indigenous
 Dipcadi ciliare (Zeyh. ex Harv.) Baker, indigenous
 Dipcadi crispum Baker, indigenous
 Dipcadi glaucum (Burch. ex Ker Gawl.) Baker, indigenous
 Dipcadi gracillimum Baker, indigenous
 Dipcadi longifolium (Ker Gawl.) Baker, indigenous
 Dipcadi marlothii Engl. indigenous
 Dipcadi papillatum Oberm. indigenous
 Dipcadi platyphyllum Baker, indigenous
 Dipcadi rigidifolium Baker, indigenous
 Dipcadi vaginatum Baker, indigenous
 Dipcadi venenatum Schinz, accepted as Dipcadi longifolium (Ker Gawl.) Baker
 Dipcadi viride (L.) Moenc, indigenous

Drimia 
Genus Drimia:
 Drimia acarophylla E.Brink & A.P.Dold, endemic
 Drimia albiflora (B.Nord.) J.C.Manning & Goldblatt, endemic
 Drimia altissima (L.f.) Ker Gawl. indigenous
 Drimia angustifolia Baker, indigenous
 Drimia anomala (Baker) Baker, endemic
 Drimia arenicola (B.Nord.) J.C.Manning & Goldblatt, endemic
 Drimia barkerae Oberm. ex J.C.Manning & Goldblatt, endemic
 Drimia calcarata (Baker) Stedje, indigenous
 Drimia capensis (Burm.f.) Wijnands, endemic
 Drimia chalumnensis A.P.Dold & E.Brink, endemic
 Drimia ciliaris Jacq. accepted as Drimia elata Jacq.
 Drimia ciliata (L.f.) J.C.Manning & Goldblatt, endemic
 Drimia cochlearis Mart.-Azorin, M.B.Crespo & A.P.Dold, endemic
 Drimia convallarioides (L.f.) J.C.Manning & Goldblatt, endemic
 Drimia cooperi (Baker) Benth. ex Baker, accepted as Drimia echinostachya (Baker) Eggli & N.R.Crouch
 Drimia cooperi Baker, accepted as Ledebouria concoor (Baker) Jessop, endemic
 Drimia cremnophila Van Jaarsv. endemic
 Drimia cuscutoides (Burch. ex Baker) J.C.Manning & Goldblatt, accepted as Drimia intricata (Baker) J.C.Manning & Goldblatt indigenous
 Drimia cyanelloides (Baker) J.C.Manning & Goldblatt, endemic
 Drimia delagoensis (Baker) Jessop, indigenous
 Drimia depressa (Baker) Jessop, indigenous
 Drimia dregei (Baker) J.C.Manning & Goldblatt, endemic
 Drimia echinostachya (Baker) Eggli & N.R.Crouch, endemic
 Drimia elata Jacq. indigenous
 Drimia ensifolia Eckl. accepted as Ledebouria ensifolia (Eckl.) S.Venter & T.J.Edwards	
 Drimia exuviata (Jacq.) Jessop, endemic
 Drimia fasciata (B.Nord.) J.C.Manning & Goldblatt, indigenous
 Drimia filifolia (Jacq.) J.C.Manning & Goldblatt, endemic
 Drimia fimbrimarginata Snijman, endemic
 Drimia flagellaris T.J.Edwards, D.Styles & N.R.Crouch, endemic
 Drimia fragrans (Jacq.) J.C.Manning & Goldblatt, endemic
 Drimia haworthioides Baker, endemic
 Drimia hesperantha J.C.Manning & Goldblatt, endemic
 Drimia hyacinthoides Baker, endemic
 Drimia indica (Roxb.) Jessop, indigenous
 Drimia intricata (Baker) J.C.Manning & Goldblatt, indigenous
 Drimia involuta (J.C.Manning & Snijman) J.C.Manning & Goldblatt, endemic
 Drimia karooica (Oberm.) J.C.Manning & Goldblatt, endemic
 Drimia kniphofioides (Baker) J.C.Manning & Goldblatt, endemic
 Drimia ligulata J.C.Manning & Goldblatt, endemic
 Drimia loedolffiae Van Jaarsv. endemic
 Drimia macrantha (Baker) Baker, indigenous
 Drimia macrocentra (Baker) Jessop, indigenous
 Drimia marginata (Thunb.) Jessop, endemic
 Drimia media Jacq., endemic
 Drimia minor (A.V.Duthie) Jessop, endemic
 Drimia montana A.P.Dold & E.Brink, endemic
 Drimia multifolia (G.J.Lewis) Jessop, endemic
 Drimia multisetosa (Baker) Jessop, indigenous
 Drimia mzimvubuensis Van Jaarsv. endemic
 Drimia nana (Snijman) J.C.Manning & Goldblatt, endemic
 Drimia neriniformis Baker, accepted as Drimia sphaerocephala Baker
 Drimia physodes (Jacq.) Jessop, indigenous
 Drimia platyphylla (B.Nord.) J.C.Manning & Goldblatt, indigenous
 Drimia pulchromarginata J.C.Manning & Goldblatt, endemic
 Drimia pusilla Jacq. endemic
 Drimia robusta Baker, accepted as Drimia elata Jacq.
 Drimia salteri (Compton) J.C.Manning & Goldblatt, endemic
 Drimia sanguinea (Schinz) Jessop, indigenous
 Drimia sclerophylla J.C.Manning & Goldblatt, endemic
 Drimia sigmoidea J.C.Manning & Deacon, indigenous
 Drimia sphaerocephala Baker, indigenous
 Drimia stenocarpa J.C.Manning & Deacon, endemic
 Drimia uniflora J.C.Manning & Goldblatt, indigenous
 Drimia uranthera (R.A.Dyer) J.C.Manning & Goldblatt, endemic
 Drimia vermiformis J.C.Manning & Goldblatt, endemic
 Drimia virens (Schltr.) J.C.Manning & Goldblatt, endemic

Drimiopsis 
Genus Drimiopsis:
 Drimiopsis atropurpurea N.E.Br. accepted as Ledebouria atropurpurea (N.E.Br.) J.C.Manning & Goldblatt
 Drimiopsis burkei Baker, accepted as Ledebouria burkei (Baker) J.C.Manning & Goldblatt
 Drimiopsis burkei Baker subsp. stolonissima U.Mull.-Doblies & D.Mull.-Doblies, accepted as Ledebouria burkei (Baker) J.C.Manning & Goldblatt subsp. stolonissima (U.Mull.-Doblies & D.Mull.-Doblies)
 Drimiopsis comptonii U.Mull.-Doblies & D.Mull.-Doblies, accepted as Ledebouria comptonii (U.Mull.-Doblies & D.Mull.-Doblies) J.C.Manning & Goldblatt
 Drimiopsis davidsoniae U.Mull.-Doblies & D.Mull.-Doblies, accepted as Ledebouria davidsoniae (U.Mull.-Doblies & D.Mull.-Doblies) J.C.Manning & Goldblatt
 Drimiopsis lachenalioides (Baker) Jessop, accepted as Ledebouria lachenalioides (Baker) J.C.Manning & Goldblatt
 Drimiopsis linioseta Hankey & Lebatha, accepted as Ledebouria linioseta (Hankey & Lebatha) J.C.Manning & Goldblatt, indigenous
 Drimiopsis maculata Lindl. & Paxton, accepted as Ledebouria petiolata J.C.Manning & Goldblatt
 Drimiopsis maxima Baker, accepted as Ledebouria humifusa (Baker) J.C.Manning & Goldblatt
 Drimiopsis pusilla U.Mull.-Doblies & D.Mull.-Doblies, accepted as Ledebouria pusilla (U.Mull.-Doblies & D.Mull.-Doblies) J.C.Manning & Goldblatt	
 Drimiopsis reilleyana U.Mull.-Doblies & D.Mull.-Doblies, accepted as Ledebouria reilleyana (U.Mull.-Doblies & D.Mull.-Doblies) J.C.Manning & Goldblatt	
 Drimiopsis woodii Baker, accepted as Ledebouria woodii (Baker) J.C.Manning & Goldblatt

Eliokarmos 
Genus Eliokarmos:
 Eliokarmos craibii Mart.-Azorin, M.B.Crespo, M.Pinter & Wetschnig, accepted as Ornithogalum craibii (Mart.-Azorin, M.B.Crespo, M.Pinter & Wetschnig) J.C.Manning, endemic

Elsiea 
Genus Elsiea:
 Elsiea corymbosa F.M.Leight. accepted as Ornithogalum esterhuyseniae Oberm.

Ethesia 
Genus Ethesia:
 Ethesia tanquana Mart.-Azorin & M.B.Crespo, accepted as Ornithogalum tanquanum (Mart.-Azorin & M.B.Crespo) J.C.Manning & Goldblatt

Eucomis 
Genus Eucomis:
 Eucomis amaryllidifolia Baker, indigenous
 Eucomis autumnalis (Mill.) Chitt. indigenous
 Eucomis autumnalis (Mill.) Chitt. subsp. amaryllidifolia (Baker) Reyneke, indigenous
 Eucomis autumnalis (Mill.) Chitt. subsp. autumnalis, indigenous
 Eucomis autumnalis (Mill.) Chitt. subsp. clavata (Baker) Reyneke, indigenous
 Eucomis bicolor Baker, indigenous
 Eucomis bifolia Jacq. accepted as Massonia bifolia (Jacq.) J.C.Manning & Goldblatt, indigenous
 Eucomis comosa (Houtt.) Wehrh. indigenous
 Eucomis comosa (Houtt.) Wehrh. var. comosa, endemic
 Eucomis comosa (Houtt.) Wehrh. var. striata (G.Don) Willd. endemic
 Eucomis grimshawii G.D.Duncan & Zonn. endemic
 Eucomis humilis Baker, indigenous
 Eucomis montana Compton, indigenous
 Eucomis pallidiflora Baker, indigenous
 Eucomis pallidiflora Baker subsp. pallidiflora, indigenous
 Eucomis pallidiflora Baker subsp. pole-evansii (N.E.Br.) Reyneke ex J.C.Manning, indigenous
 Eucomis pillansii L.Guthrie, accepted as Eucomis regia (L.) L'Her.
 Eucomis pole-evansii N.E.Br. accepted as Eucomis pallidiflora Baker subsp. pole-evansii (N.E.Br.) Reyneke ex J.C.Manning
 Eucomis regia (L.) L'Her. endemic
 Eucomis schijffii Reyneke, indigenous
 Eucomis vandermerwei I.Verd. endemic
 Eucomis zambesiaca Baker, indigenous

Galtonia 
Genus Galtonia:
 Galtonia candicans (Baker) Decne. accepted as Ornithogalum candicans (Baker) J.C.Manning & Goldblatt
 Galtonia princeps (Baker) Decne. accepted as Ornithogalum princeps (Baker) J.C.Manning & Goldblatt
 Galtonia regalis Hilliard & B.L.Burtt, accepted as Ornithogalum regale (Hilliard & B.L.Burtt) J.C.Manning & Goldblatt
 Galtonia viridiflora I.Verd. accepted as Ornithogalum viridiflorum (I.Verd.) J.C.Manning & Goldblatt

Hyacinthus 
Genus Hyacinthus:
 Hyacinthus bifolius Boiteau ex Cav. accepted as Lachenalia pygmaea (Jacq.) G.D.Duncan, indigenous
 Hyacinthus corymbosus L. accepted as Lachenalia corymbosa (L.) J.C.Manning & Goldblatt, indigenous
 Hyacinthus gawleri (Kunth) Baker, accepted as Lachenalia corymbosa (L.) J.C.Manning & Goldblatt, indigenous
 Hyacinthus orchioides L. accepted as Lachenalia orchioides (L.) Aiton, indigenous
 Hyacinthus paucifolius W.F.Barker, accepted as Lachenalia paucifolia (W.F.Barker) J.C.Manning & Goldblatt, indigenous

Lachenalia 
Genus Lachenalia:
 Lachenalia adamii G.D.Duncan, endemic
 Lachenalia alba W.F.Barker ex G.D.Duncan, endemic
 Lachenalia albida Tratt. accepted as Lachenalia contaminata Aiton, indigenous
 Lachenalia algoensis Schonland, endemic
 Lachenalia aloides (L.f.) Engl. endemic
 Lachenalia aloides (L.f.) Engl. var. aurea (Lindl.) Engl. accepted as Lachenalia flava Andrews, endemic
 Lachenalia aloides (L.f.) Engl. var. quadricolor (Jacq.) Engl. accepted as Lachenalia quadricolor Jacq. endemic
 Lachenalia aloides (L.f.) Engl. var. vanzyliae W.F.Barker, accepted as Lachenalia vanzyliae (W.F.Barker) G.D.Duncan & T.J.Edwards, endemic
 Lachenalia aloides (L.f.) Hort. ex Asch. & Graebn. accepted as Lachenalia aloides (L.f.) Engl. indigenous
 Lachenalia aloides (L.f.) Pers. accepted as Lachenalia aloides (L.f.) Engl. indigenous
 Lachenalia ameliae W.F.Barker, endemic
 Lachenalia angelica W.F.Barker, endemic
 Lachenalia anguinea Sweet, endemic
 Lachenalia angustifolia Jacq. accepted as Lachenalia contaminata Aiton, indigenous
 Lachenalia arbuthnotiae W.F.Barker, endemic
 Lachenalia arenicola G.D.Duncan & Helme, endemic
 Lachenalia argillicola G.D.Duncan, endemic
 Lachenalia attenuata W.F.Barker ex G.D.Duncan, endemic
 Lachenalia aurea Lindl. accepted as Lachenalia flava Andrews, indigenous
 Lachenalia aurioliae G.D.Duncan, endemic
 Lachenalia bachmannii Baker, endemic
 Lachenalia barbarae G.D.Duncan, endemic
 Lachenalia barkeriana U.Mull.-Doblies, B.Nord. & D.Mull.-Doblies, endemic
 Lachenalia bicolor Lodd. accepted as Lachenalia pallida Aiton, indigenous
 Lachenalia bifolia (Burm.f.) W.F.Barker ex G.D.Duncan accepted as Lachenalia bulbifera (Cirillo) Engl. endemic
 Lachenalia bifolia Ker Gawl. accepted as Lachenalia rosea Andrews, indigenous
 Lachenalia bolusii W.F.Barker, endemic
 Lachenalia botryoides Tratt. accepted as Lachenalia purpureo-caerulea Jacq. indigenous
 Lachenalia bowieana Baker accepted as Lachenalia nervosa Ker Gawl. indigenous
 Lachenalia bowkeri Baker, endemic
 Lachenalia brevipes Baker accepted as Lachenalia bachmannii Baker, indigenous
 Lachenalia bruynsii G.D.Duncan, endemic
 Lachenalia buchubergensis Dinter, indigenous
 Lachenalia bulbifera (Cirillo) Engl. endemic
 Lachenalia calcicola (U.Mull.-Doblies & D.Mull.-Doblies) G.D.Duncan, endemic
 Lachenalia callista G.D.Duncan & T.J.Edwards, endemic
 Lachenalia campanulata Baker, endemic
 Lachenalia canaliculata G.D.Duncan, endemic
 Lachenalia capensis W.F.Barker, endemic
 Lachenalia carnosa Baker, endemic
 Lachenalia cernua G.D.Duncan, endemic
 Lachenalia comptonii W.F.Barker, endemic
 Lachenalia concordiana Schltr. ex W.F.Barker, endemic
 Lachenalia congesta W.F.Barker, endemic
 Lachenalia contaminata Aiton, endemic
 Lachenalia convallariodora Stapf, accepted as Lachenalia fistulosa Baker, indigenous
 Lachenalia convallarioides Baker, endemic
 Lachenalia convallarioides Baker var. robusta Baker, accepted as Lachenalia convallarioides Baker, indigenous
 Lachenalia cooperi Baker, endemic
 Lachenalia corymbosa (L.) J.C.Manning & Goldblatt, endemic
 Lachenalia dasybotrya Diels, endemic
 Lachenalia dehoopensis W.F.Barker, endemic
 Lachenalia doleritica G.D.Duncan, endemic
 Lachenalia duncanii W.F.Barker, endemic
 Lachenalia elegans W.F.Barker, endemic
 Lachenalia elegans W.F.Barker var. flava W.F.Barker, accepted as Lachenalia karoopoortensis G.D.Duncan, endemic
 Lachenalia elegans W.F.Barker var. membranacea W.F.Barker, accepted as Lachenalia membranacea (W.F.Barker) G.D.Duncan, endemic
 Lachenalia elegans W.F.Barker var. suaveolens W.F.Barker, accepted as Lachenalia suaveolens (W.F.Barker) G.D.Duncan, endemic
 Lachenalia ensifolia (Thunb.) J.C.Manning & Goldblatt, endemic
 Lachenalia ensifolia (Thunb.) J.C.Manning & Goldblatt subsp. ensifolia, endemic
 Lachenalia ensifolia (Thunb.) J.C.Manning & Goldblatt subsp. maughanii (W.F.Barker) G.D.Duncan, endemic
 Lachenalia esterhuyseniae W.F.Barker, accepted as Lachenalia juncifolia Baker, endemic
 Lachenalia fistulosa Baker, endemic
 Lachenalia flava Andrews, endemic
 Lachenalia fragrans Andrews, accepted as Lachenalia nervosa Ker Gawl. indigenous
 Lachenalia fragrans Jacq. accepted as Lachenalia pallida Aiton, indigenous
 Lachenalia fragrans Lodd. accepted asLachenalia contaminata Aiton, indigenous
 Lachenalia framesii W.F.Barker, endemic
 Lachenalia giessii W.F.Barker, indigenous
 Lachenalia gillettii W.F.Barker, accepted as Lachenalia pallida Aiton, endemic
 Lachenalia glauca (W.F.Barker) G.D.Duncan, endemic
 Lachenalia glaucina Jacq. accepted as Lachenalia orchioides (L.) Aiton subsp. glaucina (Jacq.) G.D.Duncan, indigenous
 Lachenalia glaucina Jacq. var. parviflora W.F.Barker, accepted as Lachenalia orchioides (L.) Aiton subsp. parviflora (W.F.Barker) G.D.Duncan, indigenous
 Lachenalia glaucophylla W.F.Barker, endemic
 Lachenalia graminifolia Sol. ex Baker, accepted as Dipcadi hyacinthoides Baker	
 Lachenalia haarlemensis Fourc. endemic
 Lachenalia hirta (Thunb.) Thunb. endemic
 Lachenalia hirta (Thunb.) Thunb. var. exserta W.F.Barker, accepted as Lachenalia hirta (Thunb.) Thunb. endemic
 Lachenalia hyacinthina Hort. accepted as Lachenalia contaminata Aiton, indigenous
 Lachenalia hyacinthoides Jacq. accepted as Lachenalia contaminata Aiton, indigenous
 Lachenalia inconspicua G.D.Duncan, endemic
 Lachenalia isopetala Jacq. endemic
 Lachenalia judithiae G.D.Duncan, endemic
 Lachenalia juncifolia Baker, endemic
 Lachenalia juncifolia Baker var. campanulata W.F.Barker accepted as Lachenalia magentea G.D.Duncan, endemic
 Lachenalia karooica W.F.Barker ex G.D.Duncan, endemic
 Lachenalia karoopoortensis G.D.Duncan, endemic
 Lachenalia klinghardtiana Dinter, indigenous
 Lachenalia kliprandensis W.F.Barker, endemic
 Lachenalia krugeri G.D.Duncan, endemic
 Lachenalia lactosa G.D.Duncan, endemic
 Lachenalia lanceaefolia Jacq. accepted as Ledebouria revoluta (L.f.) Jessop, indigenous
 Lachenalia lanceaefolia Sims var. maculata Tratt. accepted as Ledebouria revoluta (L.f.) Jessop, indigenous
 Lachenalia latifolia Tratt. accepted as Lachenalia nervosa Ker Gawl. indigenous
 Lachenalia latimerae W.F.Barker, endemic
 Lachenalia leipoldtii G.D.Duncan, endemic
 Lachenalia leomontana W.F.Barker, endemic
 Lachenalia lilacina Baker, accepted as Lachenalia orchioides (L.) Aiton subsp. glaucina (Jacq.) G.D.Duncan, indigenous
 Lachenalia liliiflora Jacq. endemic
 Lachenalia linguiformis Lam. accepted as Lachenalia bulbifera (Cirillo) Engl. indigenous
 Lachenalia longibracteata E.Phillips, endemic
 Lachenalia longituba (A.M.van der Merwe) J.C.Manning & Goldblatt, endemic
 Lachenalia lucida Ker Gawl. accepted as Lachenalia pallida Aiton, indigenous
 Lachenalia lutea G.D.Duncan, endemic
 Lachenalia luteola Jacq. endemic
 Lachenalia luteola Jacq. var. pallida Tratt. accepted as Lachenalia luteola Jacq. indigenous
 Lachenalia lutzeyeri G.D.Duncan, endemic
 Lachenalia macgregoriorum W.F.Barker, endemic
 Lachenalia macrophylla Lem. accepted as Lachenalia flava Andrews, indigenous
 Lachenalia maculata Tratt. accepted as Ledebouria revoluta (L.f.) Jessop, indigenous
 Lachenalia magentea G.D.Duncan, endemic
 Lachenalia margaretiae W.F.Barker, endemic
 Lachenalia marginata W.F.Barker, endemic
 Lachenalia marginata W.F.Barker subsp. marginata, endemic
 Lachenalia marginata W.F.Barker subsp. neglecta Schltr. ex G.D.Duncan, endemic
 Lachenalia marlothii W.F.Barker ex G.D. endemic
 Lachenalia martiniae W.F.Barker, endemic
 Lachenalia martleyi G.D.Duncan, endemic
 Lachenalia massonii Baker, accepted as Lachenalia trichophylla Baker, indigenous
 Lachenalia mathewsii W.F.Barker, endemic
 Lachenalia maughanii (W.F.Barker) J.C.Manning & Goldblatt, accepted as Lachenalia ensifolia (Thunb.) J.C.Manning & Goldblatt subsp. maughanii (W.F.Barker) G.D.Duncan, endemic
 Lachenalia maximiliani Schltr. ex W.F.Barker, endemic
 Lachenalia mediana Jacq. endemic
 Lachenalia mediana Jacq. subsp. mediana, endemic
 Lachenalia mediana Jacq. subsp. rogersii (Baker) G.D.Duncan, endemic
 Lachenalia mediana Jacq. var. rogersii (Baker) W.F.Barker, accepted as Lachenalia mediana Jacq. subsp. rogersii (Baker) G.D.Duncan, endemic
 Lachenalia membranacea (W.F.Barker) G.D.Duncan, endemic
 Lachenalia minima W.F.Barker, endemic
 Lachenalia moniliformis W.F.Barker, endemic
 Lachenalia montana Schltr. ex W.F.Barker, endemic
 Lachenalia muirii W.F.Barker, accepted as Lachenalia sessiliflora Andrews, endemic
 Lachenalia multifolia W.F.Barker, endemic
 Lachenalia mutabilis Lodd. ex Sweet, endemic
 Lachenalia namaquensis Schltr. ex W.F.Barker, endemic
 Lachenalia nardousbergensis G.D.Duncan, endemic
 Lachenalia neilii W.F.Barker ex G.D.Duncan, endemic
 Lachenalia nervosa Ker Gawl. endemic
 Lachenalia nordenstamii W.F.Barker, indigenous
 Lachenalia obscura Schltr. ex G.D.Duncan, endemic
 Lachenalia odoratissima Baker, accepted as Lachenalia pallida Aiton, indigenous
 Lachenalia orchioides (L.) Aiton, endemic
 Lachenalia orchioides (L.) Aiton subsp. glaucina (Jacq.) G.D.Duncan, endemic
 Lachenalia orchioides (L.) Aiton subsp. orchioides, endemic
 Lachenalia orchioides (L.) Aiton subsp. parviflora (W.F.Barker) G.D.Duncan, endemic
 Lachenalia orchioides (L.) Aiton var. glaucina (Jacq.) W.F.Barker, accepted as Lachenalia orchioides (L.) Aiton subsp. glaucina (Jacq.) G.D.Duncan, endemic
 Lachenalia orthopetala Jacq. endemic
 Lachenalia ovatifolia L.Guthrie, accepted as Lachenalia carnosa Baker, indigenous
 Lachenalia pallida Aiton, endemic
 Lachenalia pallida Lindl. accepted as Lachenalia orchioides (L.) Aiton subsp. glaucina (Jacq.) G.D.Duncan, indigenous
 Lachenalia pallida Lindl. var. coerulescens Lindl. accepted as Lachenalia orchioides (L.) Aiton subsp. glaucina (Jacq.) G.D.Duncan, indigenous
 Lachenalia patentissima G.D.Duncan, endemic
 Lachenalia patula Jacq. endemic
 Lachenalia paucifolia (W.F.Barker) J.C.Manning & Goldblatt, endemic
 Lachenalia peersii Marloth ex W.F.Barker, endemic
 Lachenalia pendula Aiton, accepted as Lachenalia bulbifera (Cirillo) Engl. endemic
 Lachenalia perryae G.D.Duncan, endemic
 Lachenalia petiolata Baker, accepted as Lachenalia pusilla Jacq. indigenous
 Lachenalia physocaulos W.F.Barker, endemic
 Lachenalia polyphylla Baker, endemic
 Lachenalia polypodantha Schltr. ex W.F.Barker, endemic
 Lachenalia polypodantha Schltr. ex W.F.Barker subsp. eburnea G.D.Duncan, endemic
 Lachenalia polypodantha Schltr. ex W.F.Barker subsp. polypodantha, endemic
 Lachenalia punctata Jacq. endemic
 Lachenalia purpurea Jacq. accepted as Lachenalia pallida Aiton, indigenous
 Lachenalia purpureo-caerulea Jacq. endemic
 Lachenalia pusilla Jacq. endemic
 Lachenalia pustulata F.Dietr. accepted as Lachenalia pallida Aiton, indigenous
 Lachenalia pustulata Jacq. accepted as Lachenalia pallida Aiton, endemic
 Lachenalia pustulata Jacq. var. densiflora Tratt. accepted as Lachenalia pallida Aiton, indigenous
 Lachenalia pygmaea (Jacq.) G.D.Duncan, endemic
 Lachenalia pyramidalis Dehnh. accepted as Lachenalia pallida Aiton, indigenous
 Lachenalia quadricolor Jacq. endemic
 Lachenalia quadricolor Jacq. var. lutea Sims, accepted as Lachenalia flava Andrews, indigenous
 Lachenalia racemosa Ker Gawl. accepted as Lachenalia pallida Aiton, indigenous
 Lachenalia reclinata F.Dietr. accepted as Lachenalia pallida Aiton, indigenous
 Lachenalia reflexa Thunb. endemic
 Lachenalia rhodantha Baker, accepted as Lachenalia campanulata Baker, indigenous
 Lachenalia roodeae E.Phillips, accepted as Lachenalia splendida Diels, indigenous
 Lachenalia rosea Andrews, endemic
 Lachenalia rubida Jacq. accepted as Lachenalia punctata Jacq. indigenous
 Lachenalia rubida Jacq. var. punctata (Jacq.) Baker, accepted as Lachenalia punctata Jacq. endemic
 Lachenalia rubida Jacq. var. tigrina (Jacq.) Baker, accepted as Lachenalia punctata Jacq. endemic
 Lachenalia salteri W.F.Barker, endemic
 Lachenalia sanguinolenta Willd. ex Kunth, accepted as Lachenalia rosea Andrews, indigenous
 Lachenalia sargeantii W.F.Barker, endemic
 Lachenalia schelpei W.F.Barker, endemic
 Lachenalia schlechteri Baker, endemic
 Lachenalia sessiliflora Andrews, endemic
 Lachenalia speciosa F.Dietr. accepted as Dipcadi glaucum (Burch. ex Ker Gawl.) Baker, indigenous
 Lachenalia splendida Diels, endemic
 Lachenalia stayneri W.F.Barker, endemic
 Lachenalia suaveolens (W.F.Barker) G.D.Duncan, endemic
 Lachenalia subspicata Fourc. accepted as Lachenalia bowkeri Baker, indigenous
 Lachenalia succulenta Masson ex Baker, accepted as Lachenalia patula Jacq. indigenous
 Lachenalia summerfieldii G.D.Duncan, endemic
 Lachenalia thomasiae W.F.Barker ex G.D.Duncan, endemic
 Lachenalia thunbergii G.D.Duncan & T.J.Edwards, endemic
 Lachenalia tigrina Jacq.Lachenalia punctata Jacq. indigenous
 Lachenalia trichophylla Baker, endemic
 Lachenalia tricolor Jacq. accepted as Lachenalia aloides (L.f.) Engl. indigenous
 Lachenalia tricolor Thunb. accepted as Lachenalia aloides (L.f.) Engl. indigenous
 Lachenalia tricolor Thunb. var. aurea (Lindl.) Baker accepted as Lachenalia flava Andrews, indigenous
 Lachenalia tricolor Thunb. var. aurea (Lindl.) Hook.f. accepted as Lachenalia flava Andrews, indigenous
 Lachenalia tricolor Thunb. var. luteola (Jacq.) Baker, accepted as Lachenalia luteola Jacq. indigenous
 Lachenalia tricolor Thunb. var. luteola Ker Gawl. accepted as Lachenalia flava Andrews, indigenous
 Lachenalia tricolor Thunb. var. quadricolor (Jacq.) Baker, accepted as Lachenalia quadricolor Jacq. indigenous
 Lachenalia undulata Masson ex Baker, endemic
 Lachenalia unicolor Jacq. accepted as Lachenalia pallida Aiton, endemic
 Lachenalia unicolor Jacq. var. fragrans (Jacq.) Baker, accepted as Lachenalia pallida Aiton, indigenous
 Lachenalia unicolor Jacq. var. purpurea (Jacq.) Baker, accepted as Lachenalia pallida Aiton, indigenous
 Lachenalia unifolia Jacq. endemic
 Lachenalia unifolia Jacq. var. pappei Baker, accepted as Lachenalia rosea Andrews, indigenous
 Lachenalia unifolia Jacq. var. rogersii Baker, accepted as Lachenalia mediana Jacq. subsp. rogersii (Baker) G.D.Duncan, indigenous
 Lachenalia unifolia Jacq. var. schlechteri (Baker) W.F.Barker, accepted as Lachenalia schlechteri Baker, endemic
 Lachenalia unifolia Jacq. var. wrightii Baker, accepted as Lachenalia wrightii Baker, endemic
 Lachenalia ustulata Banks ex Schult. & Schult.f. accepted as Lachenalia orthopetala Jacq. indigenous
 Lachenalia valeriae G.D.Duncan, endemic
 Lachenalia vanzyliae (W.F.Barker) G.D.Duncan & T.J.Edwards, endemic
 Lachenalia variegata W.F.Barker, endemic
 Lachenalia ventricosa Schltr. ex W.F.Barker, endemic
 Lachenalia versicolor Baker var. fragrans (Jacq.) Baker, accepted as Lachenalia pallida Aiton, indigenous
 Lachenalia versicolor Baker var. purpurea (Jacq.) Baker, accepted as Lachenalia pallida Aiton, indigenous
 Lachenalia versicolor Baker var. unicolor (Jacq.) Baker, accepted as Lachenalia pallida Aiton, indigenous
 Lachenalia verticillata W.F.Barker, endemic
 Lachenalia violacea Jacq. endemic
 Lachenalia violacea Jacq. var. glauca W.F.Barker, accepted as Lachenalia glauca (W.F.Barker) G.D.Duncan, endemic
 Lachenalia viridiflora W.F.Barker, endemic
 Lachenalia viridis (L.) Aiton, accepted as Dipcadi viride (L.) Moench, indigenous
 Lachenalia whitehillensis W.F.Barker, endemic
 Lachenalia wrightii Baker, endemic
 Lachenalia xerophila Schltr. ex G.D.Duncan, endemic
 Lachenalia youngii Baker, endemic
 Lachenalia zebrina W.F.Barker, endemic
 Lachenalia zebrina W.F.Barker forma densiflora W.F.Barker, accepted as Lachenalia zebrina W.F.Barker, endemic
 Lachenalia zeyheri Baker, endemic

Ledebouria 
Genus Ledebouria:
 Ledebouria apertiflora (Baker) Jessop, indigenous
 Ledebouria asperifolia (Van der Merwe) S.Venter, indigenous
 Ledebouria atrobrunnea S.Venter, endemic
 Ledebouria atropurpurea (N.E.Br.) J.C.Manning & Goldblatt, endemic
 Ledebouria burkei (Baker) J.C.Manning & Goldblatt, indigenous
 Ledebouria burkei (Baker) J.C.Manning & Goldblatt subsp. burkei, indigenous
 Ledebouria burkei (Baker) J.C.Manning & Goldblatt subsp. stolonissima (U.Mull.-Doblies & D.Mull.-Dob, endemic
 Ledebouria comptonii (U.Mull.-Doblies & D.Mull.-Doblies) J.C.Manning & Goldblatt, endemic
 Ledebouria concoor (Baker) Jessop, endemic
 Ledebouria confusa S.Venter, indigenous
 Ledebouria cooperi (Hook.f.) Jessop, indigenous
 Ledebouria coriacea S.Venter, endemic
 Ledebouria cremnophila S.Venter & Van Jaarsv., endemic
 Ledebouria crispa S.Venter, endemic
 Ledebouria davidsoniae (U.Mull.-Doblies & D.Mull.-Doblies) J.C.Manning & Goldblatt, endemic
 Ledebouria dolomiticola S.Venter, endemic
 Ledebouria ensifolia (Eckl.) S.Venter & T.J.Edwards, indigenous
 Ledebouria floribunda (Baker) Jessop, indigenous
 Ledebouria galpinii (Baker) S.Venter & T.J.Edwards, endemic
 Ledebouria glauca S.Venter, indigenous
 Ledebouria graminifolia (Baker) Jessop, accepted as Ledebouria leptophylla (Baker) S.Venter, endemic
 Ledebouria humifusa (Baker) J.C.Manning & Goldblatt, endemic
 Ledebouria hypoxidioides (Schonland) Jessop, endemic
 Ledebouria inquinata (C.A.Sm.) Jessop, indigenous
 Ledebouria lachenalioides (Baker) J.C.Manning & Goldblatt, endemic
 Ledebouria lepida (N.E.Br.) S.Venter, endemic
 Ledebouria leptophylla (Baker) S.Venter, indigenous
 Ledebouria linioseta (Hankey & Lebatha) J.C.Manning & Goldblatt, endemic
 Ledebouria luteola Jessop, indigenous
 Ledebouria macowanii (Baker) S.Venter, indigenous
 Ledebouria marginata (Baker) Jessop, indigenous
 Ledebouria maxima (Van der Merwe) J.C.Manning & Goldblatt, endemic
 Ledebouria megaphylla (Hankey ex J.M.H.Shaw) Van Jaarsv. & Eggli, indigenous
 Ledebouria minima (Baker) S.Venter, indigenous
 Ledebouria minor (Van der Merwe) J.C.Manning & Goldblatt, endemic
 Ledebouria mokobulanensis Hankey & T.J.Edwards, endemic
 Ledebouria monophylla S.Venter, indigenous
 Ledebouria ovalifolia (Schrad.) Jessop, endemic
 Ledebouria ovatifolia (Baker) Jessop, indigenous
 Ledebouria ovatifolia (Baker) Jessop subsp. ovatifolia	, endemic
 Ledebouria ovatifolia (Baker) Jessop subsp. scabrida N.R.Crouch & T.J.Edwards, endemic
 Ledebouria papillata S.Venter, indigenous
 Ledebouria pardalota S.Venter, indigenous
 Ledebouria parvifolia S.Venter, endemic
 Ledebouria petiolata J.C.Manning & Goldblatt, indigenous
 Ledebouria pilosa (Van der Merwe) J.C.Manning & Goldblatt, endemic
 Ledebouria pustulata S.Venter, endemic
 Ledebouria remifolia S.Venter, indigenous
 Ledebouria revoluta (L.f.) Jessop, indigenous
 Ledebouria rupestris (Van der Merwe) S.Venter, indigenous
 Ledebouria sandersonii (Baker) S.Venter & T.J.Edwards, indigenous
 Ledebouria socialis (Baker) Jessop, endemic
 Ledebouria transvaalensis (Van der Merwe) J.C.Manning & Goldblatt, endemic
 Ledebouria undulata (Jacq.) Jessop, indigenous
 Ledebouria venteri Van Jaarsv. & A.E.van Wyk, endemic
 Ledebouria viscosa Jessop, endemic
 Ledebouria woodii (Baker) J.C.Manning & Goldblatt, endemic
 Ledebouria zebrina (Baker) S.Venter, indigenous

Lindneria 
Genus Lindneria:
 Lindneria clavata (Mast.) Speta, accepted as Pseudogaltonia clavata (Mast.) E.Phillips

Litanthus 
Genus Litanthus:
 Litanthus pusillus Harv, accepted as Drimia uniflora J.C.Manning & Goldblatt

Massonia 
Genus Massonia:
 Massonia amoena Mart.-Azorin, M.Pinter & Wetschnig, indigenous
 Massonia angustifolia L.f. endemic
 Massonia bifolia (Jacq.) J.C.Manning & Goldblatt, indigenous
 Massonia bokkeveldiana Poelln, accepted as Massonia tenella Sol. ex Baker, indigenous
 Massonia calvata Baker, indigenous
 Massonia citrina M.Pinter, Deutsch, U.Mull.-Doblies & D.Mull.-Doblies, endemic
 Massonia corymbosa (L.) Ker Gawl, accepted as Lachenalia corymbosa (L.) J.C.Manning & Goldblatt, indigenous
 Massonia dentata Mart.-Azorin, V.R.Clark, M.Pinter, M.B.Crespo & Wetschnig, indigenous
 Massonia depressa Houtt. endemic
 Massonia echinata L.f. endemic
 Massonia ensifolia (Thunb.) Ker Gawl, accepted as Lachenalia ensifolia (Thunb.) J.C.Manning & Goldblatt, indigenous
 Massonia grandiflora Lindl, accepted as Massonia depressa Houtt.
 Massonia hirsuta Link & Otto, accepted as Massonia echinata L.f.
 Massonia jasminiflora Burch. ex Baker, indigenous
 Massonia lanceolata Thunb, accepted as Massonia angustifolia L.f. indigenous
 Massonia latebrosa Masson ex Baker, endemic
 Massonia luteovirens (Mart.-Azorin, M.Pinter & Wetschnig) J.C.Manning, indigenous
 Massonia odorata Hook.f, accepted as Lachenalia ensifolia (Thunb.) J.C.Manning & Goldblatt, indigenous
 Massonia pseudoechinata Mart.-Azorin, M.Pinter & Wetschnig, endemic
 Massonia pustulata Jacq. endemic
 Massonia pygmaea Kunth, indigenous
 Massonia pygmaea Kunth subsp. kamiesbergensis U.Mull.-Doblies & D.Mull.-Doblies, endemic
 Massonia pygmaea Kunth subsp. pygmaea, endemic
 Massonia roggeveldensis Mart.-Azorin, M.Pinter & Wetschnig, endemic
 Massonia sempervirens U.Mull.-Doblies, G.Milkuhn & D.Mull.-Doblies, endemic
 Massonia sessiliflora (Dinter) Mart.-Azorin, M.B.Crespo, M.Pinter & Wetschnig, indigenous
 Massonia sessiliflora (Dinter) U.Mull.-Doblies & D.Mull.-Doblies, accepted as Massonia sessiliflora (Dinter) Mart.-Azorin, M.B.Crespo, M.Pinter & Wetschnig, indigenous
 Massonia setulosa Baker, indigenous
 Massonia tenella Sol. ex Baker, endemic
 Massonia undulata Thunb, accepted as Lachenalia pusilla Jacq. indigenous
 Massonia uniflora Sol. ex Baker, accepted as Lachenalia ensifolia (Thunb.) J.C.Manning & Goldblatt, indigenous
 Massonia violacea Andrews, accepted as Lachenalia pygmaea (Jacq.) G.D.Duncan, indigenous
 Massonia wittebergensis U.Mull.-Doblies & D.Mull.-Doblies, endemic

Merwilla 
Genus Merwilla:
 Merwilla dracomontana (Hilliard & B.L.Burtt) Speta, endemic
 Merwilla plumbea (Lindl.) Speta, indigenous
 Muscari orchioides (L.) Mill. accepted as Lachenalia orchioides (L.) Aiton, indigenous
 Neobakeria angustifolia (L.f.) Schltr. accepted as Massonia angustifolia L.f. indigenous
 Neobakeria comata (Burch. ex Baker) Schltr. accepted as Daubenya comata (Burch. ex Baker) J.C.Manning & A.M.van der Merwe
 Neobakeria heterandra Isaac, accepted as Massonia pygmaea Kunth subsp. pygmaea
 Neobakeria namaquensis Schltr. accepted as Daubenya namaquensis (Schltr.) J.C.Manning & Goldblatt
 Neopatersonia falcata G.J.Lewis, accepted as Ornithogalum falcatum (G.J.Lewis) J.C.Manning & Goldblatt
 Neopatersonia namaquensis G.J.Lewis, accepted as Ornithogalum filicaule J.C.Manning & Goldblatt
 Neopatersonia uitenhagensis Schonland, accepted as Ornithogalum neopatersonia J.C.Manning & Goldblatt

Nicipe 
Genus Nicipe:
 Nicipe lithopsoides (Van Jaarsv.) Mart.-Azorin, M.B.Crespo, A.P.Dold, M.Pinter & Wetschnig, accepted as Ornithogalum juncifolium Jacq. endemic
 Nicipe rosulata Mart.-Azorin, M.B.Crespo, A.P.Dold, M.Pinter & Wetschnig, accepted as Ornithogalum rosulatum (Mart.-Azorin, M.B.Crespo, A.P.Dold, M.Pinter & Wetschnig) J.C.Manning, endemic

Ornithogalum 
Genus Ornithogalum:
 Ornithogalum abyssinicum (Jacq.) J.C.Manning & Goldblatt, indigenous
 Ornithogalum acutum J.C.Manning & Goldblatt, accepted as Albuca acuminata Baker, indigenous
 Ornithogalum adseptentrionesvergentulu U.Mull.-Doblies & D.Mull.-Doblies, endemic
 Ornithogalum aetfatense U.Mull.-Doblies & D.Mull.-Doblies, endemic
 Ornithogalum albanense J.C.Manning & Goldblatt, accepted as Albuca longifolia Baker, endemic
 Ornithogalum anguinum F.M.Leight. ex Oberm. endemic
 Ornithogalum apertum (I.Verd.) Oberm. accepted as Albuca concordiana Baker
 Ornithogalum aristatum J.C.Manning & Goldblatt, accepted as Albuca caudata Jacq. indigenous
 Ornithogalum auratum J.C.Manning & Goldblatt, accepted as Albuca aurea Jacq. endemic
 Ornithogalum autumnulum U.Mull.-Doblies & D.Mull.-Doblies, accepted as Albuca autumnula (U.Mull.-Doblies & D.Mull.-Doblies) J.C.Manning & Goldblatt, endemic
 Ornithogalum bakerianum (Bolus) J.C.Manning & Goldblatt, accepted as Dipcadi bakerianum Bolus, indigenous
 Ornithogalum battenianum (Hilliard & B.L.Burtt) J.C.Manning & Goldblatt, accepted as Albuca batteniana Hilliard & B.L.Burtt, endemic
 Ornithogalum baurii (Baker) J.C.Manning & Goldblatt, accepted as Albuca baurii Baker, indigenous
 Ornithogalum baurii Baker, endemic
 Ornithogalum bicornutum F.M.Leight. endemic
 Ornithogalum bifoliatum (R.A.Dyer) J.C.Manning & Goldblatt, accepted as Albuca bifoliata R.A.Dyer, endemic
 Ornithogalum britteniae F.M.Leight. ex Oberm. endemic
 Ornithogalum brucebayeri U.Mull.-Doblies & D.Mull.-Doblies, accepted as Albuca obtusa J.C.Manning & Goldblatt, endemic
 Ornithogalum campanulatum U.Mull.-Doblies & D.Mull.-Doblies, endemic
 Ornithogalum candicans (Baker) J.C.Manning & Goldblatt, indigenous
 Ornithogalum candidum Oberm. accepted as Albuca candida (Oberm.) J.C.Manning & Goldblatt
 Ornithogalum capillare J.M.Wood & M.S.Evans, indigenous
 Ornithogalum ceresianum F.M.Leight. indigenous
 Ornithogalum ciliiferum U.Mull.-Doblies & D.Mull.-Doblies, endemic
 Ornithogalum circinatum J.C.Manning & Goldblatt, accepted as Albuca spiralis L.f. endemic
 Ornithogalum clanwilliamae-gloria J.C.Manning & Goldblatt, accepted as Albuca clanwilliamaegloria U.Mull.-Doblies, endemic
 Ornithogalum clavatum (Mast.) J.C.Manning & Goldblatt, accepted as Pseudogaltonia clavata (Mast.) E.Phillips, indigenous
 Ornithogalum concordianum (Baker) U.Mull.-Doblies & D.Mull.-Doblies, accepted as Albuca concordiana Baker, indigenous
 Ornithogalum conicum Jacq. indigenous
 Ornithogalum conicum Jacq. subsp. conicum, accepted as Ornithogalum conicum Jacq. indigenous
 Ornithogalum conicum Jacq. subsp. strictum (L.Bolus) Oberm. accepted as Ornithogalum strictum L.Bolus, endemic
 Ornithogalum constrictum F.M.Leight. endemic
 Ornithogalum cooperi (Baker) J.C.Manning & Goldblatt, accepted as Albuca cooperi Baker, indigenous
 Ornithogalum corticatum Mart.-Azorin, endemic
 Ornithogalum costatulum U.Mull.-Doblies & D.Mull.-Doblies, accepted as Albuca costatula (U.Mull.-Doblies & D.Mull.-Doblies) J.C.Manning & Goldblatt
 Ornithogalum craibii (Mart.-Azorin, M.B.Crespo, M.Pinter & Wetschnig) J.C.Manning, endemic
 Ornithogalum cremnophilum (Van Jaarsv. & A.E.van Wyk) J.C.Manning & Goldblatt, accepted as Albuca cremnophila Van Jaarsv. & A.E.van Wyk, endemic
 Ornithogalum crinifolium (Baker) J.C.Manning & Goldblatt, accepted as Albuca crinifolia Baker, endemic
 Ornithogalum crispifolium F.M.Leight. accepted as Ornithogalum graminifolium Thunb.
 Ornithogalum crispum (Baker) J.C.Manning & Goldblatt, accepted as Dipcadi crispum Baker, indigenous
 Ornithogalum crudenii (Archibald) J.C.Manning & Goldblatt, accepted as Albuca crudenii Archibald, endemic
 Ornithogalum dalyae (Baker) J.C.Manning & Goldblatt, accepted as Albuca dalyae Baker, endemic
 Ornithogalum decipiens (U.Mull.-Doblies) J.C.Manning & Goldblatt, accepted as Albuca decipiens U.Mull.-Doblies, endemic
 Ornithogalum decusmontium G.Will. endemic
 Ornithogalum deltoideum Baker, indigenous
 Ornithogalum diluculum Oberm. accepted as Albuca dilucula (Oberm.) J.C.Manning & Goldblatt, endemic
 Ornithogalum dipcadioides Baker, accepted as Dipcadi gracillimum Baker, indigenous
 Ornithogalum diphyllum Baker, endemic
 Ornithogalum dividens J.C.Manning & Goldblatt, accepted as Albuca paradoxa Dinter, indigenous
 Ornithogalum dolichopharynx U.Mull.-Doblies & D.Mull.-Doblies, endemic
 Ornithogalum drakensbergense J.C.Manning & Goldblatt, accepted as Albuca rupestris Hilliard & B.L.Burtt, indigenous
 Ornithogalum dregeanum Kunth, endemic
 Ornithogalum dubium Houtt. endemic
 Ornithogalum durandianum (Schinz) J.C.Manning & Goldblatt, accepted as Dipcadi marlothii Engl. indigenous
 Ornithogalum echinospermum (U.Mull.-Doblies) J.C.Manning & Goldblatt, accepted as Albuca echinosperma U.Mull.-Doblies, endemic
 Ornithogalum esterhuyseniae Oberm. endemic
 Ornithogalum etesiogaripense U.Mull.-Doblies & D.Mull.-Doblies, accepted as Albuca deserticola J.C.Manning & Goldblatt subsp. deserticola
 Ornithogalum etesiogaripense U.Mull.-Doblies & D.Mull.-Doblies subsp. longipilosum U.Mull.-Doblies &, accepted as Albuca deserticola J.C.Manning & Goldblatt subsp. longipilosa (U.Mull.-Doblies & D.Mull.-Doblies) J.
 Ornithogalum exuviatum (Baker) J.C.Manning & Goldblatt, accepted as Albuca exuviata Baker, indigenous
 Ornithogalum falcatum (G.J.Lewis) J.C.Manning & Goldblatt, indigenous
 Ornithogalum fastigiatum (Dryand.) J.C.Manning & Goldblatt, accepted as Albuca fastigiata Dryand. var. fastigiata, endemic
 Ornithogalum filicaule J.C.Manning & Goldblatt, endemic
 Ornithogalum fimbrifolium J.C.Manning & Goldblatt, accepted as Albuca ciliaris U.Mull.-Doblies, endemic
 Ornithogalum fimbrimarginatum F.M.Leight. accepted as Ornithogalum dubium Houtt. endemic
 Ornithogalum flaccidum (Jacq.) J.C.Manning & Goldblatt, accepted as Albuca flaccida Jacq. endemic
 Ornithogalum flexuosum (Thunb.) U.Mull.-Doblies & D.Mull.-Doblies, indigenous
 Ornithogalum foetidum (U.Mull.-Doblies) J.C.Manning & Goldblatt, accepted as Albuca foetida U.Mull.-Doblies, endemic
 Ornithogalum fragrans (Jacq.) J.C.Manning & Goldblatt, accepted as Albuca fragrans Jacq. endemic
 Ornithogalum galpinii Baker, accepted as Ornithogalum tenuifolium F.Delaroche subsp. tenuifolium
 Ornithogalum geniculatum Oberm. indigenous
 Ornithogalum gethylloides U.Mull.-Doblies & D.Mull.-Doblies, accepted as Albuca gethylloides (U.Mull.-Doblies & D.Mull.-Doblies) J.C.Manning & Goldblatt, endemic
 Ornithogalum gifbergense U.Mull.-Doblies & D.Mull.-Doblies, indigenous
 Ornithogalum gildenhuysii Van Jaarsv. accepted as Albuca gildenhuysii (Van Jaarsv.) Van Jaarsv. endemic
 Ornithogalum glanduliferum J.C.Manning & Goldblatt, accepted as Albuca glandulosa Baker, endemic
 Ornithogalum glandulosum Oberm. accepted as Albuca glandulifera J.C.Manning & Goldblatt, indigenous
 Ornithogalum glaucescens J.C.Manning & Goldblatt, accepted as Albuca glauca Baker, indigenous
 Ornithogalum glaucifolium U.Mull.-Doblies & D.Mull.-Doblies, accepted as Albuca glaucifolia (U.Mull.-Doblies & D.Mull.-Doblies) J.C.Manning & Goldblatt, endemic
 Ornithogalum goswinii (U.Mull.-Doblies) J.C.Manning & Goldblatt, accepted as Albuca goswinii U.Mull.-Doblies, endemic
 Ornithogalum graminifolium Thunb. indigenous
 Ornithogalum gregorianum U.Mull.-Doblies & D.Mull.-Doblies, endemic
 Ornithogalum hallii (U.Mull.-Doblies) J.C.Manning & Goldblatt, accepted as Albuca hallii U.Mull.-Doblies, indigenous
 Ornithogalum hallii Oberm. endemic
 Ornithogalum hesperanthum U.Mull.-Doblies & D.Mull.-Doblies, endemic
 Ornithogalum hesquaspoortense (U.Mull.-Doblies) J.C.Manning & Goldblatt, accepted as Albuca hesquaspoortensis U.Mull.-Doblies, endemic
 Ornithogalum hispidulum U.Mull.-Doblies & D.Mull.-Doblies, endemic
 Ornithogalum hispidum Hornem. indigenous
 Ornithogalum hispidum Hornem. subsp. bergii (Schltdl.) Oberm. endemic
 Ornithogalum hispidum Hornem. subsp. hispidum, indigenous
 Ornithogalum humile (Baker) J.C.Manning & Goldblatt, accepted as Albuca humilis Baker, indigenous
 Ornithogalum hyacinthiflorum Bergius ex Schltdl. accepted as Dipcadi brevifolium (Thunb.) Fourc. indigenous
 Ornithogalum imbricatum (F.M.Leight.) J.C.Manning & Goldblatt, accepted as Albuca juncifolia Baker, endemic
 Ornithogalum inclusum F.M.Leight. endemic
 Ornithogalum juncifolium Jacq. indigenous
 Ornithogalum juncifolium Jacq. var. emmsii Van Jaarsv. & A.E.van Wyk, endemic
 Ornithogalum juncifolium Jacq. var. juncifolium, indigenous
 Ornithogalum karachabpoortense U.Mull.-Doblies & D.Mull.-Doblies, accepted as Albuca karachabpoortensis (U.Mull.-Doblies & D.Mull.-Doblies) J.C.Manning & Goldblatt, endemic
 Ornithogalum kirstenii J.C.Manning & Goldblatt, accepted as Albuca kirstenii (J.C.Manning & Goldblatt) J.C.Manning & Goldblatt
 Ornithogalum knersvlaktense U.Mull.-Doblies & D.Mull.-Doblies, accepted as Albuca knersvlaktensis (U.Mull.-Doblies & D.Mull.-Doblies) J.C.Manning & Goldblatt, endemic
 Ornithogalum lanatum J.C.Manning & Goldblatt, accepted as Albuca villosa U.Mull.-Doblies subsp. villosa, endemic
 Ornithogalum leeupoortense U.Mull.-Doblies & D.Mull.-Doblies, endemic
 Ornithogalum leucanthum (U.Mull.-Doblies) J.C.Manning & Goldblatt, accepted as Albuca leucantha U.Mull.-Doblies, endemic
 Ornithogalum lithopsoides Van Jaarsv. accepted as Ornithogalum juncifolium Jacq. endemic
 Ornithogalum longibracteatum Jacq. accepted as Albuca bracteata (Thunb.) J.C.Manning & Goldblatt, indigenous
 Ornithogalum longicollum U.Mull.-Doblies & D.Mull.-Doblies, endemic
 Ornithogalum longifolium (Baker) J.C.Manning & Goldblatt, accepted as Albuca longifolia Baker, indigenous
 Ornithogalum longifolium (Ker Gawl.) J.C.Manning & Goldblatt, accepted as Dipcadi longifolium (Ker Gawl.) Baker, indigenous
 Ornithogalum longipes (Baker) J.C.Manning & Goldblatt, accepted as Albuca longipes Baker, endemic
 Ornithogalum macowanii (Baker) J.C.Manning & Goldblatt, accepted as Albuca macowanii Baker, endemic
 Ornithogalum maculatum Jacq. endemic
 Ornithogalum magnum (Baker) J.C.Manning & Goldblatt, accepted as Dipcadi magnum Baker, indigenous
 Ornithogalum marlothii F.M.Leight. accepted as Ornithogalum hispidum Hornem. subsp. hispidum
 Ornithogalum mater-familias U.Mull.-Doblies & D.Mull.-Doblies, endemic
 Ornithogalum maximum (Burm.f.) J.C.Manning & Goldblatt, accepted as Albuca canadensis (L.) F.M.Leight. indigenous
 Ornithogalum merxmuelleri Roessler, accepted as Ornithogalum puberulum Oberm.
 Ornithogalum monarchos U.Mull.-Doblies & D.Mull.-Doblies, accepted as Albuca monarchos (U.Mull.-Doblies & D.Mull.-Doblies) J.C.Manning & Goldblatt, endemic
 Ornithogalum monophyllum Baker, indigenous
 Ornithogalum monophyllum Baker subsp. eckardtianum U.Mull.-Doblies & D.Mull.-Doblies, endemic
 Ornithogalum monophyllum Baker subsp. monophyllum, indigenous
 Ornithogalum monticola J.C.Manning & Goldblatt, accepted as Albuca collina Baker, endemic
 Ornithogalum moylei J.C.Manning & Goldblatt, accepted as Albuca rogersii Schonland, endemic
 Ornithogalum multifolium Baker, accepted as Ornithogalum rupestre L.f. endemic
 Ornithogalum namaquanulum U.Mull.-Doblies & D.Mull.-Doblies, endemic
 Ornithogalum namaquense (Baker) J.C.Manning & Goldblatt, accepted as Albuca namaquensis Baker, indigenous
 Ornithogalum nannodes F.M.Leight. indigenous
 Ornithogalum nathoanum U.Mull.-Doblies & D.Mull.-Doblies, accepted as Albuca nathoana (U.Mull.-Doblies & D.Mull.-Doblies) J.C.Manning & Goldblatt, endemic
 Ornithogalum naviculum W.F.Barker, endemic
 Ornithogalum nelsonii (N.E.Br.) J.C.Manning & Goldblatt, accepted as Albuca nelsonii N.E.Br. endemic
 Ornithogalum neopatersonia J.C.Manning & Goldblatt, endemic
 Ornithogalum niveum Aiton, endemic
 Ornithogalum oostachyum Baker, accepted as Ornithogalum paludosum Baker
 Ornithogalum oreogenes Schltr. ex Poelln. endemic
 Ornithogalum ornithogaloides (Kunth) Oberm. accepted as Ornithogalum flexuosum (Thunb.) U.Mull.-Doblies & D.Mull.-Doblies
 Ornithogalum osmynellum U.Mull.-Doblies & D.Mull.-Doblies, accepted as Albuca osmynella (U.Mull.-Doblies & D.Mull.-Doblies) J.C.Manning & Goldblatt, endemic
 Ornithogalum ovatum Thunb. accepted as Albuca ovata (Thunb.) J.C.Manning & Goldblatt
 Ornithogalum ovatum Thunb. subsp. oliverorum U.Mull.-Doblies & D.Mull.-Doblies, accepted as Albuca ovata (Thunb.) J.C.Manning & Goldblatt, endemic
 Ornithogalum paludosum Baker, indigenous
 Ornithogalum papillatum (Oberm.) J.C.Manning & Goldblatt, accepted as Dipcadi papillatum Oberm. indigenous
 Ornithogalum papyraceum (J.C.Manning & Goldblatt) J.C.Manning & Goldblatt, accepted as Albuca papyracea J.C.Manning & Goldblatt, endemic
 Ornithogalum paucifolium U.Mull.-Doblies & D.Mull.-Doblies, accepted as Albuca paucifolia (U.Mull.-Doblies & D.Mull.-Doblies) J.C.Manning & Goldblatt subsp. paucifolia
 Ornithogalum paucifolium U.Mull.-Doblies & D.Mull.-Doblies subsp. karooparkense U.Mull.-Doblies & D. accepted as Albuca paucifolia (U.Mull.-Doblies & D.Mull.-Doblies) J.C.Manning & Goldblatt subsp. karooparkensis, endemic
 Ornithogalum pearsonii F.M.Leight. accepted as Albuca pearsonii (F.M.Leight.) J.C.Manning & Goldblatt, indigenous
 Ornithogalum pendens Van Jaarsv. endemic
 Ornithogalum pendulinum U.Mull.-Doblies & D.Mull.-Doblies, accepted as Albuca pendulina (U.Mull.-Doblies & D.Mull.-Doblies) J.C.Manning & Goldblatt
 Ornithogalum pentheri Zahlbr. accepted as Albuca pentheri (Zahlbr.) J.C.Manning & Goldblatt, endemic
 Ornithogalum perdurans A.P.Dold & S.A.Hammer, endemic
 Ornithogalum perparvum Poelln. endemic
 Ornithogalum petraeum Fourc. endemic
 Ornithogalum pilosum L.f. endemic
 Ornithogalum pilosum L.f. subsp. pullatum (F.M.Leight.) Oberm. accepted as Ornithogalum pullatum F.M.Leight.
 Ornithogalum planifolium J.C.Manning & Goldblatt, accepted as Dipcadi platyphyllum Baker, indigenous
 Ornithogalum polyodontulum U.Mull.-Doblies & D.Mull.-Doblies, accepted as Albuca polyodontula (U.Mull.-Doblies & D.Mull.-Doblies) J.C.Manning & Goldblatt
 Ornithogalum polyphyllum Jacq. accepted as Albuca consanguinea (Kunth) J.C.Manning & Goldblatt, endemic
 Ornithogalum prasinum Ker Gawl. accepted as Albuca prasina (Ker Gawl.) J.C.Manning & Goldblatt
 Ornithogalum prasinum Lindl. indigenous
 Ornithogalum princeps (Baker) J.C.Manning & Goldblatt, endemic
 Ornithogalum pruinosum F.M.Leight. indigenous
 Ornithogalum psammophorum U.Mull.-Doblies & D.Mull.-Doblies, accepted as Albuca psammophora (U.Mull.-Doblies & D.Mull.-Doblies) J.C.Manning & Goldblatt, endemic
 Ornithogalum puberulum Oberm. indigenous
 Ornithogalum puberulum Oberm. subsp. chris-bayeri U.Mull.-Doblies & D.Mull.-Doblies, accepted as Ornithogalum puberulum Oberm. 
 Ornithogalum puberulum Oberm. subsp. puberulum, accepted as Ornithogalum puberulum Oberm.
 Ornithogalum pulchrum Schinz, accepted as Albuca pulchra (Schinz) J.C.Manning & Goldblatt
 Ornithogalum pullatum F.M.Leight. endemic
 Ornithogalum rautanenii Schinz, accepted as Albuca rautanenii (Schinz) J.C.Manning & Goldblatt
 Ornithogalum readii (Baker) J.C.Manning & Goldblatt, accepted as Dipcadi readii (Baker) Baker, endemic
 Ornithogalum regale (Hilliard & B.L.Burtt) J.C.Manning & Goldblatt, indigenous
 Ornithogalum richtersveldensis Van Jaarsv. endemic
 Ornithogalum rigidifolium (Baker) J.C.Manning & Goldblatt, accepted as Dipcadi rigidifolium Baker, indigenous
 Ornithogalum robertsonianum (U.Mull.-Doblies) J.C.Manning & Goldblatt, accepted as Albuca robertsoniana U.Mull.-Doblies, endemic
 Ornithogalum rogersii Baker, endemic
 Ornithogalum rossouwii U.Mull.-Doblies & D.Mull.-Doblies, accepted as Ornithogalum maculatum Jacq. endemic
 Ornithogalum rosulatum (Mart.-Azorin, M.B.Crespo, A.P.Dold, M.Pinter & Wetschnig) J.C.Manning, endemic
 Ornithogalum rotatum U.Mull.-Doblies & D.Mull.-Doblies, endemic
 Ornithogalum rubescens F.M.Leight. endemic
 Ornithogalum rupestre L.f. endemic
 Ornithogalum sabulosum U.Mull.-Doblies & D.Mull.-Doblies, accepted as Albuca sabulosa (U.Mull.-Doblies & D.Mull.-Doblies) J.C.Manning & Goldblatt, endemic
 Ornithogalum sardienii Van Jaarsv. endemic
 Ornithogalum saundersiae Baker, indigenous
 Ornithogalum saxatilis J.C.Manning & Goldblatt, accepted as Albuca massonii Baker, endemic
 Ornithogalum scabrocostatum U.Mull.-Doblies & D.Mull.-Doblies, accepted as Albuca scabrocostata (U.Mull.-Doblies & D.Mull.-Doblies) J.C.Manning & Goldblatt, endemic
 Ornithogalum schlechteri (Baker) J.C.Manning & Goldblatt, accepted as Albuca schlechteri Baker, endemic
 Ornithogalum schlechterianum Schinz, endemic
 Ornithogalum schoenlandii (Baker) J.C.Manning & Goldblatt, accepted as Albuca schoenlandii Baker, endemic
 Ornithogalum secundum Jacq. accepted as Albuca secunda (Jacq.) J.C.Manning & Goldblatt, endemic
 Ornithogalum seineri (Engl. & K.Krause) Oberm. accepted as Albuca seineri (Engl. & K.Krause) J.C.Manning & Goldblatt, indigenous
 Ornithogalum semipedale (Baker) U.Mull.-Doblies & D.Mull.-Doblies, accepted as Albuca semipedalis Baker, endemic
 Ornithogalum sephtonii Hilliard & B.L.Burtt, endemic
 Ornithogalum setosum (Jacq.) J.C.Manning & Goldblatt, accepted as Albuca setosa Jacq. indigenous
 Ornithogalum shawii (Baker) J.C.Manning & Goldblatt, accepted as Albuca shawii Baker, indigenous
 Ornithogalum simile J.C.Manning & Goldblatt, accepted as Albuca affinis Baker, endemic
 Ornithogalum stapfii Schinz, accepted as Albuca stapfii (Schinz) J.C.Manning & Goldblatt
 Ornithogalum strictum L.Bolus, indigenous
 Ornithogalum strigulosum U.Mull.-Doblies & D.Mull.-Doblies, accepted as Albuca strigulosa (U.Mull.-Doblies & D.Mull.-Doblies) J.C.Manning & Goldblatt
 Ornithogalum stuetzelianum U.Mull.-Doblies & D.Mull.-Doblies, accepted as Albuca stuetzeliana (U.Mull.-Doblies & D.Mull.-Doblies) J.C.Manning & Goldblatt, indigenous
 Ornithogalum suaveolens Jacq. accepted as Albuca suaveolens (Jacq.) J.C.Manning & Goldblatt, indigenous
 Ornithogalum subcoriaceum L.Bolus, accepted as Ornithogalum dubium Houtt. indigenous
 Ornithogalum subglandulosum U.Mull.-Doblies & D.Mull.-Doblies, accepted as Albuca subglandulosa (U.Mull.-Doblies & D.Mull.-Doblies) J.C.Manning & Goldblatt, endemic
 Ornithogalum synadelphicum U.Mull.-Doblies & D.Mull.-Doblies, endemic
 Ornithogalum synanthifolium F.M.Leight. indigenous
 Ornithogalum tanquanum (Mart.-Azorin & M.B.Crespo) J.C.Manning & Goldblatt, endemic
 Ornithogalum tenuifolium F.Delaroche, indigenous
 Ornithogalum tenuifolium F.Delaroche subsp. aridum Oberm. accepted as Albuca virens (Ker Gawl.) J.C.Manning & Goldblatt subsp. arida (Oberm.) J.C.Manning & Goldblatt, indigenous
 Ornithogalum tenuifolium F.Delaroche subsp. tenuifolium, indigenous
 Ornithogalum teretifolium J.C.Manning & Goldblatt, accepted as Albuca polyphylla Baker, indigenous
 Ornithogalum thermarum (Van Jaarsv.) J.C.Manning & Goldblatt, accepted as Albuca thermarum Van Jaarsv. endemic
 Ornithogalum thermophilum F.M.Leight. endemic
 Ornithogalum thunbergianulum U.Mull.-Doblies & D.Mull.-Doblies, endemic
 Ornithogalum thyrsoides Jacq. endemic
 Ornithogalum tortile J.C.Manning & Goldblatt, accepted as Albuca tortuosa Baker, endemic
 Ornithogalum tortuosum Baker, endemic
 Ornithogalum toxicarium C.Archer & R.H.Archer, accepted as Albuca toxicaria (C.Archer & R.H.Archer) J.C.Manning & Goldblatt, indigenous
 Ornithogalum trachyphyllum (U.Mull.-Doblies) J.C.Manning & Goldblatt, accepted as Albuca trachyphylla U.Mull.-Doblies, endemic
 Ornithogalum tubiforme (Oberm.) Oberm. accepted as Albuca tubiformis (Oberm.) J.C.Manning & Goldblatt
 Ornithogalum uitenhagense (Schonland) J.C.Manning & Goldblatt, accepted as Ornithogalum neopatersonia J.C.Manning & Goldblatt, endemic
 Ornithogalum unifoliatum (G.D.Rowley) Oberm. accepted as Albuca unifoliata G.D.Rowley, endemic
 Ornithogalum unifolium Retz. accepted as Albuca unifolia (Retz.) J.C.Manning & Goldblatt
 Ornithogalum unifolium Retz. var. vestitum U.Mull.-Doblies & D.Mull.-Doblies, accepted as Albuca unifolia (Retz.) J.C.Manning & Goldblatt, endemic
 Ornithogalum vaginatum (Baker) J.C.Manning & Goldblatt, accepted as Dipcadi vaginatum Baker, indigenous
 Ornithogalum vallis-gratiae Schltr. ex Poelln. endemic
 Ornithogalum verae U.Mull.-Doblies & D.Mull.-Doblies, endemic
 Ornithogalum viridiflorum (I.Verd.) J.C.Manning & Goldblatt, indigenous
 Ornithogalum viscosum (L.f.) J.C.Manning & Goldblatt, accepted as Albuca viscosa L.f. indigenous
 Ornithogalum weberlingiorum (U.Mull.-Doblies) J.C.Manning & Goldblatt, accepted as Albuca weberlingiorum U.Mull.-Doblies, endemic
 Ornithogalum wilsonii J.C.Manning & Goldblatt, accepted as Albuca corymbosa Baker, endemic
 Ornithogalum xanthochlorum Baker, endemic
 Ornithogalum xanthocodon (Hilliard & B.L.Burtt) J.C.Manning & Goldblatt, accepted as Albuca xanthocodon Hilliard & B.L.Burtt, endemic
 Ornithogalum zebrinellum U.Mull.-Doblies & D.Mull.-Doblies, endemic
 Ornithogalum zebrinum (Baker) Oberm. accepted as Albuca zebrina Baker, endemic

Periboea 
Genus Periboea:
 Periboea corymbosa (L.) Kunth, accepted as Lachenalia corymbosa (L.) J.C.Manning & Goldblatt, indigenous
 Periboea gawleri Kunth, accepted as Lachenalia corymbosa (L.) J.C.Manning & Goldblatt, indigenous
 Periboea oliveri U.Mull.-Doblies & D.Mull.-Doblies, accepted as Lachenalia paucifolia (W.F.Barker) J.C.Manning & Goldblatt, indigenous
 Periboea paucifolia (W.F.Barker) U.Mull.-Doblies & D.Mull.-Doblies, accepted as Lachenalia paucifolia (W.F.Barker) J.C.Manning & Goldblatt, indigenous

Polyanthes 
Genus Polyanthes:
 Polyanthes pygmaea Jacq. accepted as Lachenalia pygmaea (Jacq.) G.D.Duncan, indigenous

Polyxena 
Genus Polyxena:
 Polyxena angustifolia (L.f.) Baker, accepted as Massonia angustifolia L.f. indigenous
 Polyxena bakeri T.Durand & Schinz, accepted as Massonia echinata L.f. indigenous
 Polyxena burchellii (Baker) Baker, accepted as Daubenya zeyheri (Kunth) J.C.Manning & A.M.van der Merwe, indigenous
 Polyxena calcicola U.Mull.-Doblies & D.Mull.-Doblies, accepted as Lachenalia calcicola (U.Mull.-Doblies & D.Mull.-Doblies) G.D.Duncan, indigenous
 Polyxena comata (Burch. ex Baker) Baker, accepted as Daubenya comata (Burch. ex Baker) J.C.Manning & A.M.van der Merwe, indigenous
 Polyxena corymbosa (L.) Jessop, accepted as Lachenalia corymbosa (L.) J.C.Manning & Goldblatt, indigenous
 Polyxena ensifolia (Thunb.) Schonland, accepted as Lachenalia ensifolia (Thunb.) J.C.Manning & Goldblatt, indigenous
 Polyxena haemanthoides Baker, accepted as Daubenya marginata (Willd. ex Kunth) J.C.Manning & A.M.van der Merwe, indigenous
 Polyxena longituba A.M.van der Merwe, accepted as Lachenalia longituba (A.M.van der Merwe) J.C.Manning & Goldblatt, indigenous
 Polyxena marginata (Willd. ex Kunth) Baker, accepted as Daubenya marginata (Willd. ex Kunth) J.C.Manning & A.M.van der Merwe, indigenous
 Polyxena maughanii W.F.Barker, accepted as Lachenalia ensifolia (Thunb.) J.C.Manning & Goldblatt subsp. maughanii (W.F.Barker) G.D.Duncan, indigenous
 Polyxena odorata (Hook.f.) Baker, accepted as Lachenalia ensifolia (Thunb.) J.C.Manning & Goldblatt, indigenous
 Polyxena odorata (Hook.f.) W.A.Nicholson, accepted as Lachenalia ensifolia (Thunb.) J.C.Manning & Goldblatt, indigenous
 Polyxena paucifolia (W.F.Barker) A.M.van der Merwe & J.C.Manning, accepted as Lachenalia paucifolia (W.F.Barker) J.C.Manning & Goldblatt, indigenous
 Polyxena pusilla (Jacq.) Schltr. accepted as Lachenalia pusilla Jacq. indigenous
 Polyxena pygmaea (Jacq.) Kunth, accepted as Lachenalia pygmaea (Jacq.) G.D.Duncan, indigenous
 Polyxena rugulosa (Licht. ex Kunth) Baker, accepted as Daubenya marginata (Willd. ex Kunth) J.C.Manning & A.M.van der Merwe, indigenous
 Polyxena uniflora (Sol. ex Baker) Benth. & Hook. ex Durand & Schinz, accepted as Lachenalia ensifolia (Thunb.) J.C.Manning & Goldblatt, indigenous

Pseudogaltonia 
Genus Pseudogaltonia:
 Pseudogaltonia clavata (Mast.) E.Phillips, indigenous
 Pseudogaltonia liliiflora J.C.Manning & Goldblatt, endemic

Pseudoprospero 
Genus Pseudoprospero:
 Pseudoprospero firmifolium (Baker) Speta, endemic
 Pseudoprospero firmifolium (Baker) Speta subsp. firmifolium, endemic
 Pseudoprospero firmifolium (Baker) Speta subsp. natalensis J.C.Manning, endemic

Resnova 
Genus Resnova:
 Resnova humifusa (Baker) U.Mull.-Doblies & D.Mull.-Doblies, accepted as Ledebouria humifusa (Baker) J.C.Manning & Goldblatt
 Resnova lachenalioides (Baker) Van der Merwe, accepted as Ledebouria lachenalioides (Baker) J.C.Manning & Goldblatt
 Resnova maxima Van der Merwe, accepted as Ledebouria maxima (Van der Merwe) J.C.Manning & Goldblatt
 Resnova megaphylla Hankey ex J.M.H.Shaw, accepted as Ledebouria megaphylla (Hankey ex J.M.H.Shaw) Van Jaarsv. & Eggli, indigenous
 Resnova minor Van der Merwe, accepted as Ledebouria minor (Van der Merwe) J.C.Manning & Goldblatt
 Resnova pilosa Van der Merwe, accepted as Ledebouria pilosa (Van der Merwe) J.C.Manning & Goldblatt
 Resnova transvaalensis Van der Merwe, accepted as Ledebouria transvaalensis (Van der Merwe) J.C.Manning & Goldblatt, indigenous

Rhadamanthus 
Genus Rhadamanthus:
 Rhadamanthus albiflorus B.Nord. accepted as Drimia albiflora (B.Nord.) J.C.Manning & Goldblatt
 Rhadamanthus arenicola B.Nord. accepted as Drimia arenicola (B.Nord.) J.C.Manning & Goldblatt
 Rhadamanthus convallarioides (L.f.) Baker, accepted as Drimia convallarioides (L.f.) J.C.Manning & Goldblatt
 Rhadamanthus cyanelloides Baker, accepted as Drimia cyanelloides (Baker) J.C.Manning & Goldblatt
 Rhadamanthus fasciatus B.Nord. accepted as Drimia fasciata (B.Nord.) J.C.Manning & Goldblatt
 Rhadamanthus involutus J.C.Manning & Snijman, accepted as Drimia involuta (J.C.Manning & Snijman) J.C.Manning & Goldblatt
 Rhadamanthus karrooicus Oberm. accepted as Drimia karooica (Oberm.) J.C.Manning & Goldblatt
 Rhadamanthus montanus B.Nord. accepted as Drimia convallarioides (L.f.) J.C.Manning & Goldblatt
 Rhadamanthus namibensis Oberm. accepted as Drimia namibensis (Oberm.) J.C.Manning & Goldblatt
 Rhadamanthus platyphyllus B.Nord. accepted as Drimia platyphylla (B.Nord.) J.C.Manning & Goldblatt
 Rhadamanthus secundus B.Nord. accepted as Drimia secunda (B.Nord.) J.C.Manning & Goldblatt
 Rhadamanthus urantherus R.A.Dyer, accepted as Drimia uranthera (R.A.Dyer) J.C.Manning & Goldblatt

Schizobasis 
Genus Schizobasis:
 Schizobasis intricata (Baker) Baker, accepted as Drimia intricata (Baker) J.C.Manning & Goldblatt

Schizocarphus 
Genus Schizocarphus:
 Schizocarphus nervosus (Burch.) Van der Merwe, indigenous

Scilla 
Genus Scilla:
 Scilla adlamii Baker, accepted as Ledebouria cooperi (Hook.f.) Jessop
 Scilla brachyphylla Roem. & J.H.Schult. accepted as Lachenalia corymbosa (L.) J.C.Manning & Goldblatt, indigenous
 Scilla brevifolia Ker Gawl. accepted as Lachenalia corymbosa (L.) J.C.Manning & Goldblatt, indigenous
 Scilla corymbosa (L.) Ker Gawl. accepted as Lachenalia corymbosa (L.) J.C.Manning & Goldblatt, indigenous
 Scilla dracomontana Hilliard & B.L.Burtt, accepted as Merwilla dracomontana (Hilliard & B.L.Burtt) Speta
 Scilla ensifolia (Eckl.) Britten, accepted as Ledebouria ensifolia (Eckl.) S.Venter & T.J.Edwards
 Scilla firmifolia Baker, accepted as Pseudoprospero firmifolium (Baker) Speta subsp. firmifolium
 Scilla kraussii Baker, accepted as Merwilla kraussii (Baker) Speta
 Scilla natalensis Planch. accepted as Merwilla plumbea (Lindl.) Speta
 Scilla nervosa (Burch.) Jessop, accepted as Schizocarphus nervosus (Burch.) Van der Merwe
 Scilla plumbea Lindl. accepted as Merwilla plumbea (Lindl.) Speta

Spetaea 
Genus Spetaea:
 Spetaea lachenaliiflora Wetschnig & Pfosser, endemic

Stellarioides 
Genus Stellarioides:
 Stellarioides exigua Mart.-Azorin, M.B.Crespo, A.P.Dold, M.Pinter & Wetschnig, accepted as Albuca exigua (Mart.-Azorin, M.B.Crespo, A.P.Dold, M.Pinter & Wetschnig) J.C.Manning, endemic
 Stellarioides littoralis N.R.Crouch, D.Styles, A.J.Beaumont & Mart.-Azorin, accepted as Albuca littoralis (N.R.Crouch, D.Styles, A.J.Beaumont & Mart.-Azorin) J.C.Manning, endemic

Tenicroa 
Genus Tenicroa:
 Tenicroa exuviata (Jacq.) Speta, accepted as Drimia exuviata (Jacq.) Jessop
 Tenicroa filifolia (Jacq.) Oberm. accepted as Drimia filifolia (Jacq.) J.C.Manning & Goldblatt
 Tenicroa fragrans (Jacq.) Raf. accepted as Drimia fragrans (Jacq.) J.C.Manning & Goldblatt
 Tenicroa multifolia (G.J.Lewis) Oberm. accepted as Drimia multifolia (G.J.Lewis) Jessop
 Tenicroa nana Snijman, accepted as Drimia nana (Snijman) J.C.Manning & Goldblatt

Thuranthos 
Genus Thuranthos:
 Thuranthos basuticum (E.Phillips) Oberm. accepted as Drimia angustifolia Baker
 Thuranthos macranthum (Baker) C.H.Wright, accepted as Drimia macrantha (Baker) Baker
 Thuranthos nocturnale R.A.Dyer, accepted as Drimia macrantha (Baker) Baker

Trimelopter 
Genus Trimelopter:
 Trimelopter craibii Mart.-Azorin, M.B.Crespo & A.P.Dold, accepted as Albuca craibii (Mart.-Azorin, M.B.Crespo & A.P.Dold) J.C.Manning & Goldblatt, endemic

Urginea 
Genus Urginea:
 Urginea altissima (L.f.) Baker, accepted as Drimia altissima (L.f.) Ker Gawl.
 Urginea calcarata (Baker) Hilliard & B.L.Burtt, accepted as Drimia calcarata (Baker) Stedje
 Urginea capitata (Hook.) Baker, accepted as Drimia depressa (Baker) Jessop
 Urginea ciliata (L.f.) Baker, accepted as Drimia ciliata (L.f.) J.C.Manning & Goldblatt
 Urginea delagoensis Baker, accepted as Drimia delagoensis (Baker) Jessop
 Urginea depressa Baker, accepted as Drimia depressa (Baker) Jessop
 Urginea dregei Baker, accepted as Drimia dregei (Baker) J.C.Manning & Goldblatt
 Urginea epigea R.A.Dyer, accepted as Drimia altissima (L.f.) Ker Gawl.
 Urginea indica (Roxb.) Kunth, accepted as Drimia indica (Roxb.) Jessop
 Urginea kniphofioides Baker, accepted as Drimia kniphofioides (Baker) J.C.Manning & Goldblatt
 Urginea lydenburgensis R.A.Dyer, accepted as Drimia delagoensis (Baker) Jessop
 Urginea macrocentra Baker, accepted as Drimia macrocentra (Baker) Jessop
 Urginea marginata (Thunb.) Baker, accepted as Drimia marginata (Thunb.) Jessop
 Urginea minor A.V.Duthie, accepted as Drimia minor (A.V.Duthie) Jessop
 Urginea modesta Baker, accepted as Drimia calcarata (Baker) Stedje
 Urginea multisetosa Baker, accepted as Drimia multisetosa (Baker) Jessop
 Urginea physodes (Jacq.) Baker, accepted as Drimia physodes (Jacq.) Jessop
 Urginea pusilla (Jacq.) Baker, accepted as Drimia physodes (Jacq.) Jessop
 Urginea rigidifolia Baker, accepted as Drimia sclerophylla J.C.Manning & Goldblatt
 Urginea rubella Baker, accepted as Drimia calcarata (Baker) Stedje
 Urginea sanguinea Schinz, accepted as Drimia sanguinea (Schinz) Jessop
 Urginea saniensis Hilliard & B.L.Burtt, accepted as Drimia saniensis (Hilliard & B.L.Burtt) J.C.Manning & Goldblatt
 Urginea tenella Baker, accepted as Drimia calcarata (Baker) Stedje
 Urginea virens Schltr. accepted as Drimia virens (Schltr.) J.C.Manning & Goldblatt

Veltheimia 
Genus Veltheimia
 Veltheimia bracteata Harv. ex Baker, endemic
 Veltheimia capensis (L.) DC. endemic

Whiteheadia 
Genus Whiteheadia:
 Whiteheadia bifolia (Jacq.) Baker, accepted as Massonia bifolia (Jacq.) J.C.Manning & Goldblatt, indigenous
 Whiteheadia latifolia Harv. accepted as Massonia bifolia (Jacq.) J.C.Manning & Goldblatt, indigenous

References

South African plant biodiversity lists
Scilloideae